This Year of Grace is a revue with a book, music, and lyrics by Noël Coward.

It opened in London on 22 March 1928 at the London Pavilion and ran for nearly 10 months, directed by Frank Collins, with a cast featuring Sonnie Hale, Maisie Gay, Jessie Matthews, Sheilah Graham and Tilly Losch among others. Doris Zinkeisen was one of the costume designers for the production. Since the revue was still playing to capacity audiences that autumn, Noël Coward and Charles B. Cochran decided to recruit an entire new cast for the Broadway transfer to avoid breaking up the profitable London run, with Coward himself replacing Sonnie Hale, Beatrice Lillie taking over Maisie Gay's role, and Florence Desmond substituting for Laurie Devine as Coward's partner in "Dance, Little Lady".
 
Produced by Arch Selwyn, the Broadway production opened on November 7, 1928 at the Selwyn Theatre, where it ran for 157 performances. Several new numbers for Beatrice Lillie (solo or in duet with Coward) were interpolated into the original London score for this new production, while an additional Act II song "Mexico", originally included in pre-London performance, had been dropped before the London opening.

The show is also referred to as Cochran's Revue or Cochran's 1928 Revue, which was its title for the pre-London run.  The show contains three enduring Noël Coward songs: "World Weary", "A Room With a View" and "Dance, Little Lady".

Songs

Act I
 "Waiting in a Queue"
 "Mary Make Believe"
 "Try to Learn to Love"
 "Lorelei"
 "Lilac Time"
 "A Room With a View"
 "I Can't Think"
 "Teach Me to Dance Like Grandma"

Act II
 "Lido"
 "English Lido"
 "Little Women"
 "Mothers' Complaint"
 "Britannia Rules the Waves"
 "The Legend of the Lily of the Valley"
 "World Weary"
 "Dance, Little Lady"
 "Chauve Souris"
 "Love, Life and Laughter"
 "Velasquez"
 "The Sun, the Moon and You"
 "Playing the Game"

The Noël Coward Society, drawing on performing statistics from the publishers and the Performing Rights Society, ranks "A Room With a View" as among Coward's ten most popular songs.

Notes

External links
 
 This Year of Grace at noelcowardmusic.com

1928 musicals
Broadway musicals
Musicals by Noël Coward
Revues